Zionsville is a suburban town located in the extreme southeast area of Boone County, Indiana, United States, northwest of Indianapolis. The population was 14,160 at the 2010 census, 30,693 at the 2020 census.

Zionsville promotes itself as a tourist attraction, centered on its village-styled downtown area. This area consists primarily of Main Street, paved entirely in brick, which is lined with small retail stores and restaurants.

History

Zionsville was laid out in 1852 when the railroad was extended to that point. It was named for William Zion, a pioneer settler.

Abraham Lincoln made a whistle-stop speech in Zionsville in 1861 when traveling to his inauguration.

Town Hall (Castle Hall) was listed on the National Register of Historic Places in 1983.

Geography

In 2010, Zionsville annexed  of land in Eagle and Union townships.

Climate
The climate in this area is characterized by hot, humid summers and cold winters.  According to the Köppen Climate Classification system, Zionsville has a humid continental climate, abbreviated "Dfa" on climate maps. Its inclusion in this climatic type is because of its four distinct seasons, large ranges between high summer temperatures and low winter temperatures, and enough precipitation to exclude arid or semi-arid classification.

Transportation
Highways 
  Interstate 65
  Interstate 465
  Interstate 865
  US 52 - concurrent with Interstate 65, 465, and 865
  US 421
  State Road 32
  State Road 267

Airports
The Indianapolis Executive Airport (KTYQ) is located approximately five nautical miles (5.8 mi, 9.3 km) north of Zionsville's downtown area and acts as a reliever airport for Indianapolis International Airport.

Railroads and Trails
The Lafayette and Indianapolis Railroad line traversing Zionsville was owned and operated by a number of companies from its inception in 1852 until it was abandoned in 1976. In the 1990s, Zionsville re-purposed portions of the former railroad line as a shared use path. It is currently known as Big-4 Rail Trail. The Rail Trail links various parks, neighborhoods, and points of interest throughout the town, including Heritage Park, Jennings Field, and Starkey Park, and is within walking distance of Mulberry Fields and the downtown village. The trail is surrounded by trees for most of its length. It is currently undergoing construction to expand its south end.

Demographics

According to the 2016-2020 American Community Survey, the median income for a household in the town was $137,265, and the per capita income was $66,898. 3.8% of the population were estimated to be below the poverty line. The median value of owner-occupied housing units in the town was $406,800.

2020 census

As of the census of 2020, there were 30,693 people, and 10,061 households in the town. The population density was 455.3 inhabitants per square mile (175.8/km). The racial makeup of the town was 91.4% White, 1.4% African American, 0.2% Native American, 4.3% Asian, and 2.0% from two or more races. Hispanic or Latino of any race were 2.2% of the population.

There were 10,061 households, of which 73.9% were married couples living together, 4.6% had a female householder with no husband present, 2.0% had a male householder with no wife present, and 15.7% were non-families. The average household size was 2.78 and the average family size was 3.06.

The median age in the town was 39.1 years. 28.0% of residents were under the age of 18, and 12.9% were 65 years of age or older. The gender makeup of the town was 50.5% male and 49.5% female.

The median income for a householder in the town was $137,265. Males had a median income of $92,833 versus $65,622 for females. The per capita income for the town was $66,898.

2010 census
As of the census of 2010, there were 14,160 people, 5,129 households, and 3,872 families living in the town. The racial makeup of the town was 94.0% White, 1.2% African American, 0.1% Native American, 2.7% Asian, 0.5% from other races, and 1.4% from two or more races. Hispanic or Latino of any race were 2.1% of the population.

There were 5,129 households, of which 44.1% had children under the age of 18 living with them, 66.9% were married couples living together, 6.5% had a female householder with no husband present, 2.1% had a male householder with no wife present, and 24.5% were non-families. 22.0% of all households were made up of individuals, and 8.8% had someone living alone who was 65 years of age or older. The average household size was 2.75 and the average family size was 3.25.

The median age in the town was 39.6 years. 31.6% of residents were under the age of 18; 4.6% were between the ages of 18 and 24; 23.2% were from 25 to 44; 29.6% were from 45 to 64; 10.9% were 65 years of age or older. The gender makeup of the town was 48.7% male and 51.3% female.

2000 census
As of the census of 2000, there were 8,775 people, 3,063 households, and 2,407 families living in the town. The racial makeup of the town was 97.78% White, 0.33% African American, 0.11% Native American, 1.07% Asian, 0.32% from other races, and 0.39% from two or more races. Hispanic or Latino of any race were 0.97% of the population.

There were 3,063 households, out of which 45.5% had children under the age of 18 living with them, 70.5% were married couples living together, 6.8% had a female householder with no husband present, and 21.4% were non-families. 19.1% of all households were made up of individuals, and 7.5% had someone living alone who was 65 years of age or older. The average household size was 2.80 and the average family size was 3.23.

In the town, the population was spread out, with 31.7% under the age of 18, 4.2% from 18 to 24, 27.8% from 25 to 44, 25.6% from 45 to 64, and 10.7% who were 65 years of age or older. The median age was 38 years. For every 100 females, there were 93.1 males. For every 100 females age 18 and over, there were 86.8 males.

The median income for a household in the town was $81,770, and the median income for a family was $95,359. Males had a median income of $62,334 versus $35,823 for females. The per capita income for the town was $35,049.

Government
Zionsville has utilized a mayor-council government since 2015, and is one of only two Indiana "towns" with a mayor. The current mayor, Emily Styron, was elected in 2019. The Town Council consists of 7 Republican members.

List of mayors

Cultural features

The Sullivan Munce Cultural Center is an art center, genealogy center, and museum in Zionsville. It features a history of the town and a collection of Zionsville artifacts. Every year, the Sullivan Munce Cultural Center hosts the Ghost Walk, a tour through the town telling stories of Zionsville's history where participants act out small skits.

One of Zionsville's seasonal attractions, the July Fourth fireworks show hosted by the local Lion's Club, brings in people from across Indiana. Unlike many of the Independence Day celebrations in major cities, the Zionsville fireworks show has no music integrated into the performance, although there are concerts before the display.
There is also the Fall Festival which has a parade featuring sports teams, organizations from Zionsville and surrounding communities, and the Middle and High School marching bands. There is also a festival at the Lion's Park with attractions like rides, games, and food. It lasts for one weekend in September.

Zionsville contains the Goldman Union Camp Institute (or GUCI), a Jewish camp that is part of the URJ (Union for Reform Judaism).

Education

Zionsville Community Schools, which encompasses an area in Eagle and Union townships extending beyond Zionsville town limits, enjoys a very strong reputation. For the past half decade, it has been ranked among the top five public school corporations in Indiana by Indianapolis Monthly magazine. Zionsville schools have rivalries with schools in neighboring Carmel, Lebanon, and Pike Township in  Indianapolis.  The superintendent of schools is Scott Robison, who joined the district in 2006. 
 
List of schools - Zionsville Community School Corporation
 Zionsville Community High School
 Zionsville Middle School
 Zionsville West Middle School
 Eagle Elementary School
 Pleasant View Elementary School
 Stonegate Elementary School
 Union Elementary School
 Boone Meadow Elementary School
 Trailside Elementary School

The town has a lending library, the Hussey-Mayfield Memorial Public Library.

Notable people

 Albert B. Anderson, Federal judge
 Mark Baltz, NFL official
 Jeff Belskus, CEO of Hulman & Company and President of Indianapolis Motor Speedway
 Brandon Bernstein, American drag racer
 Donald Cline, Former Fertility Doctor
 Antoine Bethea, former Indianapolis Colts/current Arizona Cardinals safety
 Gary Brackett, former Indianapolis Colts linebacker
 Dallas Clark, former Indianapolis Colts tight end
 Tom Carnegie, former announcer of the Indianapolis 500
 Austin Collie, former Indianapolis Colts wide receiver
 Austin Croshere, former NBA player
 Dan Dakich, former Bowling Green State University basketball coach and radio/TV personality
 Ryan Diem, former Indianapolis Colts offensive tackle
Jared Fogle, former Subway spokesman
 Danny Granger, former Indiana Pacers/current Miami Heat small forward
 Stéphan Grégoire, race car driver
 Arthur G. Hansen, former president of Georgia Institute of Technology and Purdue University, former Chancellor of Texas A&M University System
 Grace Hartzel, fashion model
 Bill Hodges, college basketball coach, notably of the Larry Bird-led Indiana State Sycamores
 John-Michael Liles, Carolina Hurricanes NHL defenseman
 Tom Mastny, Cleveland Indians pitcher
 Derrick McKey, former NBA player
 Rob Morris, former Indianapolis Colts linebacker
 Nancy Noel, artist
 Chuck Pagano, former Indianapolis Colts head coach
 Metta World Peace, former Indiana Pacers Forward
 Kendall Phillips, Country music singer
 Jerraud Powers, former Indianapolis Colts defensive back
 Jacob Tamme, former Indianapolis Colts tight end/current Denver Broncos tight end
 Jeff Saturday, former Indianapolis Colts and Green Bay Packers center
 David Shumate, Poet
 Hunter Smith, former Indianapolis Colts punter
 Rik Smits, former Indiana Pacers center
 John Stehr, WTHR anchorman
 Lance Stephenson, Indiana Pacers player
 Brad Stevens, Boston Celtics President of Basketball Operations
 Hardress Nathaniel Swaim, Federal judge
 Jack Trudeau, former NFL quarterback
 Kelly Williamson, Triathlete
 Todd Witsken, Professional tennis player
 Jason Marnocha, Voice actor of Omen from the video game Valorant

References

External links

 Town of Zionsville

Towns in Boone County, Indiana
Towns in Indiana
Indianapolis metropolitan area
Populated places established in 1852
1852 establishments in Indiana